Wandersong is a genus of flowering plants in the family Rubiaceae, native to Cuba, Hispaniola and Puerto Rico. Among other differences from the genus Chione, from which they were split, they have fruit with two pyrenes.

Species
Currently accepted species include:

Wandersong exserta (DC.) David W.Taylor
Wandersong seminervis (Urb. & Ekman) David W.Taylor

References

Cinchonoideae
Rubiaceae genera